9 Aurigae (9 Aur) is a star system in Auriga (constellation). It has an apparent magnitude of about 5, making it visible to the naked eye in many suburban skies. Parallax estimates made by the Hipparcos spacecraft put it at about 85.7 light-years (26.3 parsecs) from the solar system.

It is a well-studied Gamma Doradus variable, and was one of the first stars to be so-classified. This star type varies in luminosity due to non-radial pulsations. Its apparent magnitude varies from 4.93 to 5.03 over a period of 1.25804 days. For that reason it has been given the variable star designation V398 Aurigae.

9 Aurigae is a multiple star system.  The naked-eye component A is a single-lined spectroscopic binary.  Only the signature of an F-type main sequence star can be seen in the spectrum, but the periodic doppler shift of the absorption lines demonstrates that there is a hidden companion in a 391.7-day orbit. The gravitational interaction of the two bodies produces variations in their respective motions, which is what creates the doppler shift.

Four other companions to 9 Aurigae are listed in multiple star catalogs, all thought to be common proper motion companions at the same distance from us as 9 Aurigae. Further-separated still is a 14th-magnitude star, component D, thought to be a more distant red giant. The most widely-separated companion is component E, another distant star.

References

Aurigae, 09
Durchmusterung objects
9174
032537
023783
1637
Spectroscopic binaries
5
Auriga (constellation)
Gamma Doradus variables
F-type main-sequence stars
Aurigae, V398